Quame Byron Riley, better known as Vicious or Li'l Vicious, is an American rapper and reggae artist.

Career
Discovered by Donovan Thomas and Doug E. Fresh at a talent show at the age of 14,  "Freaks", a Dancehall tune beat-boxed entirely by Doug E. and vocalized mainly by his protégé, a Brooklyn-born Jamaican teenage newcomer named Vicious. The song received major radio and club play, followed by video play when the video was finally produced a few months into 1994. The latter would soon ink a deal with Sony Music's Epic Records for three years. His debut album, Destination Brooklyn, was released on November 1, 1994. The album charted on three Billboard charts, peaking at number one on the Reggae charts. Its lead single was "Nika," which became his only charting single, reaching number 69 on the Billboard Hot 100 and nine on the Hot Rap Singles chart.

As Li'l Vicious, he also got the distinction of being featured on the "Reggae Soul Mix" of Mariah Carey's "Always Be My Baby" in 1996.

Discography

Album

Single

References

Year of birth missing (living people)
Living people
American rappers of Jamaican descent
Epic Records artists
Rappers from Brooklyn
Reggae fusion artists
21st-century American rappers